Fern House School (formerly Aylands School) is a coeducational special school for children who have emotional or behavioural difficulties. It was founded in 1969, and provides for up to 40 pupils in year groups 3–16. The present number of children on the roll is 44.

References

Enfield, London
Educational institutions established in 1969
Special schools in the London Borough of Enfield
1969 establishments in England
Academies in the London Borough of Enfield